Herman Dale Ashworth (February 26, 1973 – September 27, 2005) was a murderer executed by the U.S. state of Ohio. He admitted to the aggravated murder and aggravated robbery in the death of Daniel L. Baker on September 10, 1996. He was executed by lethal injection at the Southern Ohio Correctional Facility after spending 8 years, three months, and 11 days on death row.

Ashworth met Baker for the first time while drinking at the Wagon Wheel, a bar in Newark, Ohio. They went to another bar, and while returning to the Wagon Wheel at around 9 p.m., Ashworth took Baker into an alley where he beat him with his fists, feet and a 6-foot board. Ashworth would later say that Baker made unwanted sexual advances to him. Ashworth took $40 and three credit cards from Baker's wallet and went back to the Wagon Wheel. Later he took his then-girlfriend, Tanna Brett, to the alley and found Baker still alive. They went to another bar but Ashworth left, saying he would make sure Baker could not identify him. Brett returned to the alley and heard a metallic sound and found Baker's body near a metal loading dock door. A deputy-coroner would later testify that Baker's injuries were consistent with a high-speed traffic accident or plane crash.

Baker's body was later found at 3:45 a.m. by a couple walking a dog. Thirty minutes later, Ashworth made an anonymous 9-1-1 call to inform police of the beating. The call was traced and Ashworth was arrested.

He pleaded guilty at his trial and waived the right to present mitigating evidence. His defense lawyer did not cross-examine any witnesses. In May 2005, he dismissed his lawyers who were trying to keep him alive. On August 31, 2005, Ashworth refused to appear before a hearing of the Ohio Parole Board, which recommended that he be executed. Governor Bob Taft issued a statement on September 23, saying he was denying clemency. Ashworth is the fourth Ohio prisoner to drop his appeals since the death penalty was resumed in the state in 1999.

Due to Hurricane Rita his adoptive parents were unable to visit their son before the execution. They had not planned to witness the execution. For his last meal he ordered two cheeseburgers with lettuce and mayonnaise and French fries with ketchup, and drank one Dr Pepper and one Mountain Dew. The prison medical technicians took ten minutes to insert the catheter into his arm. In his final statement, he said, "A life for a life, let it be done and justice will be served." He was pronounced dead at 10:19 a.m. EST.

See also 
 Capital punishment in Ohio
 Capital punishment in the United States
 Gay panic defense
 List of people executed in Ohio
 List of people executed in the United States in 2005

References
 Clark Prosecutor

Report from the NCADP
Statement from Governor Taft
Ohio Executions
Dead Man Eating blog
2005 Capital Crimes Report, Ohio Attorney General's Office (pdf)

1973 births
2005 deaths
1996 murders in the United States
21st-century executions by Ohio
American people executed for murder
People from Licking County, Ohio
People executed by Ohio by lethal injection
People convicted of murder by Ohio
21st-century executions of American people
People from New Orleans
Executed people from Louisiana
Violence against men in North America